Mount Briar is an unincorporated community and census-designated place in Washington County, Maryland, United States. Its population was 160 as of the 2010 census.

Geography

Demographics

References

Unincorporated communities in Washington County, Maryland
Unincorporated communities in Maryland
Census-designated places in Washington County, Maryland
Census-designated places in Maryland